Gas Money may refer to:

 Gas Money (The Price Is Right), a game on the game show The Price is Right
 Gas Money, Stand Up! Records album SUR058 by Pete Lee
 Gas Money, 1994 album by Popa Chubby
 Freddy's Gas Money Tour, a music tour by Freddy Wexler

See also 
 Gas prices (disambiguation)